Paralogisticus is a genus of beetles in the family Cerambycidae, containing the following species:

 Paralogisticus drumonti Vives, 2006
 Paralogisticus pauliani Vives, 2006

References

Dorcasominae